The first season of Lois & Clark: The New Adventures of Superman originally aired between September 12, 1993 and May 8, 1994, beginning with "Pilot".

The series loosely follows the comic philosophy of writer John Byrne, with Clark Kent as the true personality, and Superman as a secondary disguise. As the show's title suggests, it focuses as much on the relationship between Clark Kent and Lois Lane on the adventures of Clark's alter-ego. The central characters in season one are Dean Cain as Clark Kent/Superman, Teri Hatcher as Lois Lane, Lane Smith as Perry White, Eddie Jones as Jonathan Kent, K Callan as Martha Kent, Michael Landes as Jimmy Olsen, Tracy Scoggins as Catherine "Cat" Grant and John Shea as Lex Luthor.

The first season was a moderate success, garnering the cast, especially Teri Hatcher and Dean Cain, critical praise for their performances. Lane Smith was a huge success, breathing life and humor into the Daily Planet editor-in-chief Perry White. John Shea also met with rave reviews over his portrayal of Lex Luthor. Michael Landes' modern-day take on the Jimmy Olsen character gained a cult following, as did Tracy Scoggins' comedic take on Cat Grant, a more recent addition to the Superman mythos at the time. Lex Luthor was killed off in the season finale, after a falling-out between Shea and the producers over the actor's strenuous commute between New York and Los Angeles. No longer a regular cast member, he only reappeared sporadically; once in season two, twice in season three, and once in season four.

Episodes

See also 

 List of Lois & Clark: The New Adventures of Superman episodes

References

External links 
 Season 1 at the Internet Movie Database

1993 American television seasons
1994 American television seasons
Lois & Clark: The New Adventures of Superman seasons